Welding